Orinda is a city in Contra Costa County, California.

Orinda may also refer to:

Places 
 Orinda Academy, high school in Orinda, California
 Orinda station, railway station in Orinda, California
 Orinda Union School District, K–8 school district in Orinda, California

People
 Katherine Philips (1631–1664), also known as Orinda, Anglo-Welsh poet, translator, and woman of letters 
 Orinda Dale Evans (born 1943), American judge

Other 
 Orinda, a Martian crater (see: List of craters on Mars: O–Z) 
 Orinda Formation, a geologic strata formation under parts of California